Uğurköy can refer to:

 Uğurköy, Borçka
 Uğurköy, İliç